In astronomy, a blueshift is a decrease in electromagnetic wavelength caused by the motion of a celestial object toward an observer.

Blueshift or blue shift may also refer to:
 Blue Shift (album), an ARIA Award-winning, 1990 album by Clarion Fracture Zone
 "Blue Shift", a song by Hawkwind from their 1993 album Electric Tepee
 "Blue Shift", a song by Lemaitre from their 2010 album "The Friendly Sound EP"
 Blueshift, an unreleased album by Splashdown
 "Blue Shift" (short story), a science fiction short story by Stephen Baxter
 Blueshifting, an information technology term defined in Redshift (theory) 
 Blue shift (molecule) (a.k.a. "hypsochromic shift"), a change in spectral band position in a spectrum of a molecule to a shorter wavelength 
 Blue shift in American politics is an observed phenomenon under which mail-in votes trend towards the Democratic Party.

See also  
 Doppler effect 
 Half-Life: Blue Shift, a computer game
 Redshift